James T. Davnie (born April 13, 1959) is a Minnesota politician and member of the Minnesota House of Representatives. A member of the Minnesota Democratic–Farmer–Labor Party (DFL), he represents District 63A, which includes portions of the city of Minneapolis in Hennepin County, which is part of the Twin Cities metropolitan area. He is also a teacher.

Early life, education, and career
Davnie graduated from Bloomington Jefferson High School in Bloomington, then went to the University of Minnesota, earning his B.S. in psychology and social work in 1988 and his M.Ed. in education in 1995. He worked as a professional chef, and has been a teacher at Buffalo Community Middle School in Buffalo since 1989.

Minnesota House of Representatives
Davnie was first elected in 2000 and has been reelected every two years since.

Personal life
Active in his community through the years, Davnie was a member of Minneapolis' Seward Neighborhood Group from 1996 to 2000 and was also a representative on the Community Advisory Committee for the Hiawatha Light Rail Transit. He is a past president and member of the governing board of Education Minnesota (1999–2001).

References

External links 

 Rep. Davnie Web Page
 Minnesota Public Radio Votetracker: Rep. Jim Davnie
 Project Votesmart - Rep. Jim Davnie Profile

1959 births
Living people
Politicians from Minneapolis
Democratic Party members of the Minnesota House of Representatives
University of Minnesota College of Education and Human Development alumni
21st-century American politicians
People from Buffalo, Minnesota